East Sussex Cricket Ground was a cricket ground in St Leonards-on-Sea, Sussex.  The ground was located at the site of a racecourse which had moved after 1826 from the Bulverhythe Salts.  It was during its time regarded as one of the finest racecourses in the United Kingdom.

The first recorded match on the ground was in 1857, when Sussex played the Marylebone Cricket Club in the grounds only first-class match.  The final recorded match held on the ground came in 1894 when the South Saxons played the Gentlemen of the Netherlands, a Netherlands side which contained the famous Carst Posthuma.

References

External links
East Sussex Cricket Ground on CricketArchive
East Sussex Cricket Ground on Cricinfo

Defunct cricket grounds in England
Defunct horse racing venues in England
Cricket grounds in East Sussex
Sport in Hastings
Defunct sports venues in East Sussex
Sports venues completed in 1857
1857 establishments in England